Tangimoana is a community in the Manawatū-Whanganui Region of the North Island of New Zealand. It had a population of 303 permanent residents in 2018. It is located 15 kilometres southwest of Bulls, and 30 kilometres west of Palmerston North.

The settlement lies on the southern bank of the Rangitīkei River near the mouth. It was developed in 1920 as a holiday place for people from Palmerston North and other inland towns and sections sold from 1921. 

The Boating Club has a licensed facility for members and their guests.  A small corner store is open daily, it sells basic supplies as well as takeaway food.

Tangimoana is well known for its laid back attitude and is popular with those seeking an alternative lifestyle. Many residents are artists and once a year they hold an Art Festival to showcase their works.

Tangimoana has limited facilities and very few employment opportunities.  Most residents travel to Palmerston North, Feilding or Levin for employment.  The main attraction is the river and beach which are both peaceful and natural.  It is a popular beach for horses and dogs.  A four-wheel drive vehicle is needed to drive directly to the ocean.

Demographics

The population of Tangimoana was 303 in the 2018 New Zealand census, an increase of 75 (32.9%) since the 2013 census, and an increase of 24 (8.6%) since the 2006 census. There were 159 males and 147 females, giving a sex ratio of 1.08 males per female. Ethnicities were 279 people  (92.1%) European/Pākehā, 57 (18.8%) Māori, 6 (2.0%) Pacific peoples, and 3 (1.0%) Asian (totals add to more than 100% since people could identify with multiple ethnicities). Of the total population, 42 people  (13.9%) were under 15 years old, 39 (12.9%) were 15–29, 162 (53.5%) were 30–64, and 60 (19.8%) were over 65.

Education

A bus service takes secondary school students into Palmerston North on weekdays. The Carnarvon bus was extended to Tangimoana in 1924.

SIGINT facility 

The New Zealand Government Communications Security Bureau operates what it describes as a radio communications interception facility in the area; it is generally believed to be a signals intelligence, or SIGINT facility operating under umbrella of the ECHELON espionage network, under the auspices the UKUSA consortium of intelligent agencies.

Flooding 
Tangimoana faces 1 in 50 year (2% AEP) flood risk, which is one of the highest in the Manawatu-Whanganui region. Horizons Regional Council's flood models show that some areas in the settlement can be subject to flood waters of 2.5 metres in such an event. Horizons discourages new habitable buildings in the settlement, however new houses in Tangimoana can still be built but with high finished floor levels to mitigate this flood risk.

Tangimoana was among the most seriously affected communities in the 2004 flooding. Other notable floods were in 1882, 1897, 1917, 1936, 1958 and 1965. In 1944 and 1967 cuttings were made to divert the river away from the village, and stopbanks were built and extended in 2010. The cuttings to shorten the river can be seen on the maps from 1928 to 2018.

Tawhirihoe Scientific Reserve 
A Department of Conservation reserve aims to conserve remnants of the dune and wetland ecosystems in the estuary. Plants include the Nationally Critical dune plant, Pimelea actea. Despite attempts to keep motor vehicles off the dunes, damage is still being done.

External links 
Secret Power - New Zealand's Role in the International Spy Network
 Secret Power, New Zealand's Role in the International Spy Network; Craig Potton Publishing, Nelson, NZ; ; 1996 (ONLINE EDITION)

References

Manawatu District
Populated places in Manawatū-Whanganui
Populated places on the Rangitīkei River